The 2012–13 Scottish Football League Second Division (also known as the 2012–13 Irn Bru Scottish Football League Second Division for sponsorship reasons) was the 18th season in the current format of 10 teams in the third-tier of Scottish football. Cowdenbeath were the current champions.

Teams

Two sides were promoted from the 2011–12 competition.  Cowdenbeath as champions, and Dumbarton as winners of the promotion play-offs. They were replaced by Queen of the South, who finished bottom of the First Division, and Ayr United, who were relegated through the first division play-offs. Stirling Albion were relegated from this division after finishing bottom, and they were replaced by Third Division winners Alloa Athletic.

Albion Rovers finished in 9th place, but were able to stay up as a result of winning the promotion play-offs. Stranraer, who had lost to Albion Rovers in the play-off final, were promoted to the Second Division after the decision was made for Rangers to start in the Third Division. Stranraer replaced Airdrie United, who will take up the space in the First Division.

Stadia and locations

League table

Results
Teams play each other four times in this league. In the first half of the season each team plays every other team twice (home and away) and then do the same in the second half of the season, for a total of 36 games.

First half of season

Second half of season

Second Division play-offs
Times are BST (UTC+1)

Semi-finals
The fourth placed team in the Third Division (Berwick Rangers) played the ninth placed team in the Second Division (East Fife) and third placed team in the Third Division (Peterhead) played the second placed team in the Third Division (Queen's Park). The play-offs were played over two legs, and the winning team in each semi-final advanced to the final.

First legs

Second legs

Final
The two semi-final winners played each other over two legs. The winning team was awarded a place in the 2013–14 Second Division.

First leg

Second leg

References

Scottish Second Division seasons
2012–13 Scottish Football League
3
Scot